Events in the year 2013 in Kazakhstan.

Incumbents
President: Nursultan Nazarbayev
Prime Minister: Serik Akhmetov

Events

January
 January 29 – SCAT Airlines Flight 760, a scheduled flight from Kokshetau to Almaty, crashed in the village of Kyzyltu, killing all 21 people on board.

May
 May 7 – The first military parade in honour of Defender of the Fatherland Day was held at the Otar Military Base.

August
 August 10 – 17 – Kazakhstan competed at the 2013 World Championships in Athletics in Moscow, Russia. A team of 17 athletes represented the country in the event.

September
 September 2 – The Third Parliament Session was opened.
 September 5 – The country took part in the G20 Summit in Saint Petersburg for the first time.

December
 December 1 – A new building of the Nazarbayev Center was opened.

Deaths
 November 16 – , People's Artist of the USSR (1959).
 December 27 – , People's Artist of the USSR (1959).

References 

 
2010s in Kazakhstan
Years of the 21st century in Kazakhstan
Kazakhstan
Kazakhstan